The Sydney Rugby League team, known as the City Rugby League team, or Combined Sydney, or Sydney Firsts, or Sydney Capitals, is a representative rugby league team. From 2021, the men's team is to consist of players selected from the New South Wales Rugby League Ron Massey Cup competition to play against a combined team selected from Country, New South Wales competitions. The women's team is selected on a region of origin basis from the NSWRL Women's Premiership.

The reorganisation in 2021 means the Sydney / City team is selected from a third-tier competition, as the Ron Massey Cup sits below the first-tier National Rugby League and the second-tier New South Wales Cup. Previously, the Sydney / City team was selected from the first-tier competition. The first match by a Sydney Metropolitan team was held in 1909 against New Zealand. The first match against a Country repsresentative team was held in 1911. Matches by Sydney against international touring teams continued until the 1970s. Annual matches by City against Country were played in most years until 1993. 
A City vs Country Origin match was introduced in 1987 and this ran until 2017, with a three season hiatus in the years 1998 to 2000.

History
The New South Wales City team first competed against New South Wales Country on 10 June 1911 which City won 29-8.  The first time the match was made an annual event began in 1928 with NSW Country defeating City 35-34. 

A Sydney team was assembled for the 1953 American All Stars tour of Australia and New Zealand. The first City V Country origin match occurred on May 16, 1987 with City running out winners 30-22.

In 2016, it was announced by the NRL that the City V Country fixture was to be scrapped beyond the 2017 season.  The reasons behind the decision were to clubs pulling their players out of the match and others cited player drain as a reason for the fixture to be culled.  There was also a sentiment that the fixture had gone from being a genuine audition match for a potential New South Wales origin jersey to being a regular game as most of the New South Wales side had already been picked prior to the match starting.

On May 14, 2017, the final City v Country fixture was played with NSW City defeating Country 20-8.

Overall, New South Wales City were much more successful than New South Wales Country winning a total of 68 games in the annual fixture as opposed to Country's 22 wins with City winning each year from 1976 to 1991.

Location
Any players whose junior football was played for a club within the greater area of Sydney city is deemed eligible to play for the City RL. Meanwhile, anyone from outside the Sydney area can be considered for selection for Country RL Team.

Men's City v Country Match

2022 Squad 
The City squad for the 2022 Open Age Men's match against Country. The team is coached by Brett Cook.

Note: Eli Levido, Manaia Rudolph, Caleb Uele (all Glebe) and Semisi Kioa (Mounties) were named in the selected squad but are not named in the programme.

Women's City vs Country Match
City v Country Women's matches were occasionally played prior to the re-introduction of a stand-alone match in 2017. In 2018 and 2019 the games were played within the National Championships. The 2020 National Championships were cancelled due to the COVID-19 Pandemic in Australia. In 2021 the National Championships were reorganised, and an open age City v Country Women's Origin was scheduled separately from the National Championships.

2022 Squad 
The following players were selected in the City Origin Women's team to play on 14 May 2022 at 4 Pines Park. The team was coached by Darrin Borthwick.

Match Details

2017 final City vs Country Origin Match

Squad

Match Details

See also

 List of New South Wales City Origin rugby league team players
 Brisbane rugby league team
 Newcastle rugby league team
 Country New South Wales rugby league team

References

External links

City vs Country History

 
Rugby league representative teams in New South Wales
City vs Country Origin
1911 establishments in Australia